Vladimir Ivanovich Osenev (8 September 1908 – 1 April 1977) was a Soviet stage, film and voice actor. After graduating from Vakhtangov Theatre in the 1930s he had a stage career spanning four decades. Yet he was more noticed by his occasional appearances in films and animation series, such as the award-winning Winnie-the-Pooh trilogy. He also played in The Brothers Karamazov, which was nominated for the Academy Award for Best Foreign Language Film in 1969. Osenev was made an Honored Artist of Russia in 1956 and People's Artist of Russia in 1969.

Osenev considered himself a serious actor and first despised the "childish" text of the narrator in Winnie-the-Pooh, but changed his attitude after seeing the final result.

Filmography
 Boule de Suif (1934) as German soldier (uncredited)
 The Great Glinka (1946) as episode  (uncredited)
 Admiral Ushakov (1953) as city dweller  (uncredited)
 Man without a Passport (1966) as Fyodor Katko
 Major Whirlwind (1967, TV Series) as Krauch
 The Seventh Companion (1968) as Priklonsky
 The Shield and the Sword (1968, TV Mini-Series) as Hitler
 The Brothers Karamazov (1969) as judge
 Subject for a Short Story (1969) as Kurbatov
 Winnie-the-Pooh (1969, Short) as Narrator (voice)
 The Flight (1971) as Tikhiy
 Winnie-the-Pooh Pays a Visit (1971, Short) as Narrator (voice)
 Winnie-the-Pooh and a Busy Day (1972, Short) as Narrator (voice)
 Diamonds for the Dictatorship of the Proletariat (1975) as Stopansky
 Agony (1981) as Shturmer (final film role)

References

External links

1908 births
Male  actors from Moscow
1977 deaths
Soviet male stage actors
Soviet male film actors
Soviet male voice actors
People's Artists of the RSFSR
Honored Artists of the RSFSR